The Immaculate Conception Church (Spanish: Iglesia de Nuestra Señora de la Inmaculada Concepción de María) is a Baroque church located in Poblacion, Upper Jasaan in Misamis Oriental, Philippines. It was declared by the National Museum as a National Cultural Treasure in Northern Mindanao due to its artistic design and cultural values.

The church was a provincial attempt to mimic the famous San Ignacio Church of Intramuros in Manila. The Jesuit brothers Francisco Rivera and Juan Cuesta are credited with the construction of the original church. At present, the church is undergoing repair and restoration pursuant to the National Cultural Heritage Act otherwise known as the "Cultural Properties Preservation and Protection Act".

History
The first church of Jasaan was built out of lime from 1723 to 1830 under the supervision of Fr. Ramos Cabas, parish priest in sitio Kabitaugan in barangay Aplaya. The first church is currently a ruins and a "cotta" or fortification is visible on the low hill near the highway. In 1859, Jasaan became the base for evangelical activities among the Manobos in Bukidnon. From Jasaan, missionaries fanned out to areas in Bukidnon now known as Malitbog, Siloo, San Luis, Linabo and Sumilao. In 1887, Father Juan Herras, a Jesuit, began the construction of the present Immaculate Conception Church. Father Gregorio Parache, S.J., was the parish priest of Jasaan at that time. It aims to mimic the famous San Ignacio Church of Intramuros in Manila

{| class="collapsible collapsed wikitable toccolours"
|-
!style="background: white" colspan=3 align="center" |Priests who served the first church in Jasaan (currently ruins) '|- 
! scope="col" width="180" style="background:#09f;"|Parish Priest
! scope="col" width="200" style="background:#39f;"|Inclusive Dates
! scope="col" width="100" style="background:#39f;"|Notes
|-
| Fray Jose Casals, OAR 
| 1834
|
|-
| Fray Manuel de Sta. Rita, OAR
| 1838
|
|-
| Dom. Vicente de Dolores, OAR 
| 1844-1845
|
|-
| Fray Gregorio Logrono del Ducisimo Nombre de Maria, OAR 
| 1845-1852
|
|-
| Fray Ramon Cabas, OAR 
| 1851
|
|-
| Fray Fernando Ramos de la Encarnacion, OAR
| 1852
|
|-
| Fray Mateo Bernard, OAR 
| March 1873 – 1877
|
|-
| Fray Benigno Jimenez, OAR 
| July 1882-January 1887
| Last priest from the Order of Augustinian-Recollect
|-
| Fr. Nenesio Llorente, SJ 
| Jan. 26, 1887 - June 25, 1887
| First Spanish Jesuit
|-
| Fr. Pablo Pastells, SJ
| June 25, 1887 - Oct. 8 - 1887
|
|-
| Fr. Juan Herras, SJ
| Nov. 1887 - Sept. 1915
| 
|-
| Fr. Juan Terricabras, SJ
| Oct. 18, 1887 - Dec. 19, 1887
|
|-
| Fr. Gregorio Parache, SJ 
| Dec. 19, 1887 - Oct. 22, 1888
|
|-
|}

Features
The church of Jasaan falls under Barn Style Baroque with originally a tri-partite partition. It spans 150 ft long and 60 ft wide. The brick wall on all sides about 20 ft high and almost 4 ft thick. The portal area leads to two semi-arched openings to the choir loft area. Vertical articulation is rendered through the shallow piers which divide the areas into three. It is further squeezed to the narrow central portion of the facade.  The church is flanked by square towers to a level above the apex of the pediment. Significant church portions includes the original brick paving, neo-Gothic retablo, and ceiling woodwork (reminiscent of basket weave).

The original facade of the church has been modified after a series of renovations. The original altar of the church has been moved backward to allow a larger area for the faithful inside the church building. The original sacristy has been moved to the side.

The church has two bell towers containing 4 bells in totality. The oldest of the four bells is dated 1807 while the largest is cast "Nuestra Señora de la Inmaculada Concepcion de Jasaan Año 1854." The old church bells of the Immaculate Conception Church of Jasaan (four of them, excluding the one that was transferred to San Agustin Cathedral at Cagayan de Oro)  bore these inscriptions around its outer rim: "Para El Pueblo de Jasaan 1860''".

Due to its cultural and historical value, the National Museum declared the Immaculate Conception Parish Church a National Cultural Treasure on July 31, 2001.

See also
List of Cultural Properties of the Philippines in Northern Mindanao
Lists of Cultural Properties of the Philippines
Roman Catholicism in the Philippines
 List of Jesuit sites

References

External links

 Culture Profile"Colonial Churches
 UNESCO Tentative List of World Heritage Site
 Restoration of 26 Philippine Churches

Roman Catholic churches in Misamis Oriental
Architecture in the Philippines
National Cultural Treasures of the Philippines